Bhadradri Ramudu is a 2004 Telugu action comedy film produced by  Maganthi Gopinath on Divya Akahara Naga Movies banner and directed by Suresh Krissna. Starring Taraka Ratna and Radhika in the lead roles and music  composed by Sri.

Cast 

 Taraka Ratna as Bhadradri Ramudu
 Radhika as Seetha
 Ali
 Vanisri
 Posani Krishna Murali
 Venu Madhav
 Rajitha
 Mallikarjuna Rao
 Chalapathi Rao

Soundtrack

References

External links 

 

2004 films
Indian action comedy films
Indian films about revenge
2000s Telugu-language films
Films directed by Suresh Krissna
2004 action comedy films